The dusky frillgoby (Bathygobius fuscus), also known as the brown frillfin,  is a species of goby which is found in the Indo-Pacific region from the South Africa north to the Red Sea and east as far as Tonga, south to Australia and north to Japan. It is a mainly coastal speciesbut it has an amphidromous life cycle and it occurs in estuaries and will move into in freshwater streams. In estuarine areas it is found mainly in the creeks preferring environments with sand and rubble, soft coral and open reefs. It feeds on detritus, as well as feeding on crustaceans, fish and algae and it is a benthic spawner.

References

fuscus
Fish described in 1830